DYAC (90.7 FM), on-air as Q Radio 90.7, is a radio station owned by Mareco Broadcasting Network and operated by Horizon of the Sun Communications. The station's studio and transmitter are located at Room 210, 3rd Floor Doña Luisa Bldg. Fuente Osmena, Cebu City.

History

Crossover started operations in 1995 on Vimcontu-owned 93.1 FM. It was located at the Mariners Court Bldg. along Legazpi Ext.
In October 2003, Crossover moved to 90.7 FM, which was acquired by Mareco from Ermita Electronics Corporation. At the same time, it transferred to its current home in Doña Luisa Bldg. along Fuente Osmena. The frequency formerly housed Energy FM from 1998 to 2003, when it transferred to Word Broadcasting Corporation-owned 89.1 FM.
At the end of 2019, Horizon of the Sun Communications (producers of Chinatown TV) took over the operations of MBNI's stations.
On November 16, 2020, the station, along with other MBNI provincial stations, started carrying the Q Radio brand and adopted a CHR/Top 40 format, similar to its Manila flagship station.

References

Q Radio
Radio stations established in 1995
1995 establishments in the Philippines